The 76-mm divisional gun M1942 (ZiS-3) (GRAU index: 52-P-354U) was a Soviet 76.2 mm divisional field gun used during World War II. ZiS was a factory designation and stood for Zavod imeni Stalina ("factory named after Stalin"), the honorific title of Artillery Factory No. 92, which first constructed this gun.

History 
Artillery Factory No. 92 began designing the ZiS-3 at the end of 1940. The ZiS-3 combined the light carriage from the 57 mm ZiS-2 anti-tank gun and the powerful 76.2 mm barrel from the F-22USV, the previous divisional field gun. The addition of a muzzle brake reduced recoil and prevented damage to the light carriage upon firing. Producing a ZiS-3 cost only a third of the time and two-thirds of the money of a F-22USV by making greater use of casting, stamping and welding.

V. G. Grabin, the chief designer of Soviet medium caliber guns, initiated the gun's development without state approval, and the prototype was hidden from the state. Marshal Grigory Kulik, commander of Soviet artillery, had ordered a halt to the production of light 45 mm anti-tank guns and 76.2 mm divisional field guns in the belief that they were inadequate; the Soviets overestimated the armour protection of the latest German heavy tanks from propaganda about the Neubaufahrzeug multi-turreted prototype tank.

The beginning of the Great Patriotic War revealed that the pre-war 76 mm guns overmatched German armour; in some cases even 12.7 mm DShK machine guns were adequate. Most of the 76 mm guns were lost early in the war; some captured examples armed German Panzerjäger self-propelled guns. Marshal Kulik ordered the F-22USV back into production. At Artillery Factory No. 92, Grabin put the ZiS-3 into mass production in December 1941.

The factory's ZiS-3 stockpile grew and went unused as the Red Army refused to accept the guns without the usual acceptance trials. Grabin convinced the army to issue the guns for impromptu testing at the front, where it proved superior to existing divisional field guns. A subsequent demonstration impressed Joseph Stalin, who praised the weapon as "a masterpiece of artillery systems design." The ZiS-3 underwent an official five-day acceptance trial in February 1942, and was then accepted into service as divisional field gun model 1942 (full official name).
Grabin worked to increase production at Artillery Factory No. 92. Conveyor assembly lines admitted the use of low-skilled labour without significant quality loss. Experienced laborers and engineers worked on complicated equipment and served as brigade leaders; they were replaced on the production line by young factory workers who were exempt from conscription, producing a new generation of skilled labourers and engineers. More than 103,000 ZiS-3s were produced by the end of the war, making it the most numerous Soviet field gun during the war.

Mass production of the ZiS-3 ceased after the war. It was replaced by the 85 mm D-44 divisional field gun. The D-44 had better anti-armour capabilities, but inferior mobility due to its increased weight.

The Finns captured 12 units, and designated them 76 K 42.

Derivatives 
At least one ZiS-3 was produced at the Reșița Works in Reșița, Romania, during 1943. This Romanian-produced copy was tested against several Romanian-designed prototypes as well as some foreign models, until eventually one of the Romanian prototypes was selected for serial production as the 75 mm Reșița M1943. This gun had incorporated a number of features from the ZiS-3. At least 375 75 mm Reșița M1943 guns were produced by Romania, including three prototypes; the gun was later mounted on the Mareșal tank destroyer.

Self-propelled mounts 
The SU-76 was an assault gun mounting the ZiS-3 on the chassis of a T-70 light tank. More than 14,000 were produced between 1942 and 1945.  The Romanian TACAM R-2 tank destroyer was a R-2 tank converted to mount the ZiS-3 in a three-sided fighting compartment.  The KSP-76 was a wartime light assault car mounting the ZiS-3; it did not advance beyond the prototype stage.

Ammunition data

Combat history 

Soviet soldiers liked the ZiS-3 for its extreme reliability, durability, and accuracy. The gun was easy to maintain and use by novice crews. The light carriage allowed the ZiS-3 to be towed by trucks, heavy jeeps, like American Lend-Lease-supplied Dodge WC-51/WC-52, simply called the 'Dodge 3/4'-tons by Soviet troops – or even manually hauled by the crew if required.

The gun was also quite popular with the German Wehrmacht. The gun was introduced into German service as the 7,62-cm-Feldkanone 288(r) and factories were retooled to produce ammunition for it.

The ZiS-3 had good anti-armour capabilities. Its armour-piercing round could knock out any early German light and medium tank. The frontal armour of later tanks, like the Tiger I and later the Panther, however, were immune to the ZiS-3.

A ZiS-3 battery had four guns, with three batteries making a division or battalion. Independent anti-tank regiments consisted of six batteries with no divisions. A staff battery included a fire-control section.

The ZiS-3 saw combat service with North Korean forces during the Korean War (1950–1953). It was also deployed by the People's Armed Forces for the Liberation of Angola (FAPLA) during the Angolan Civil War and the South African Border War and by Tanzania People's Defence Force  during Uganda–Tanzania War in 1978–1979.

Post-Cold War 
The ZiS-3 was exported to Soviet allies during the Cold War, who in turn exported it to Third World countries. In Europe, Austria received about 36 of them in 1955 and kept them in service until 1991 under the designation PaK-M42. In the 1990s, both the Croatian Army and the Army of the Republic of Serb Krajina used it.

In 2020, the gun remained in active service with the armies of at least four sovereign nations: Cambodia, Namibia, Nicaragua, and Sudan.

Wars 

 World War II
 Korean War
 Vietnam War
 Lebanese Civil War
 South African Border War
 Angolan Civil War
 Uganda–Tanzania War
 Soviet-Afghan War
 Yugoslav Wars
 Yemeni Civil War (2015–present)

Operators

Current operators

Former operators 

 
 
 
 UNITA
 
 
 
 
 
 
 
 
 
  (captured)

Gallery

Notes

References 
 Shunkov V. N. - The Weapons of the Red Army, Mn. Harvest, 1999 (Шунков В. Н. - Оружие Красной Армии. — Мн.: Харвест, 1999.)

External links 

 Ammunition data on BattleField.Ru 
 76.2mm Divisional Gun M1942 (ZiS-3) gallery in Modelling Market in Poland magazine
 Photo gallery at svsm.org
 Soviet Guns 76 mm calibre (Tank & AT) armor penetration table

World War II field artillery
76 mm artillery
World War II artillery of the Soviet Union
Nizhny Novgorod Machine-building Plant products
World War II anti-tank guns
Weapons and ammunition introduced in 1941